Lakeba Airport  is an airport in Lakeba (pronounced ), one of the Lau Islands in southern Fiji. It is operated by Airports Fiji Limited.

Facilities
It has one runway which measures .

Airlines and Destinations

References

External links
 
 Fiji Airways (official site)

Airports in Fiji
Lau Islands